Kolokolnitsa is a rural locality (a village) in Aserkhovskoye Rural Settlement, Sobinsky District, Vladimir Oblast, Russia. The population was 17 as of 2010.

Geography 
Kolokolnitsa is located 11 km east of Sobinka (the district's administrative centre) by road. Pushnino is the nearest rural locality.

References 

Rural localities in Sobinsky District